In Greek mythology, the name Socus (Ancient Greek: Σῶκος) may refer to the following personages:

Socus of Euboea, father of the seven Corybantes (Prymneus, Mimas, Acmon, Damneus, Ocythous, Idaeus, Melisseus) by Combe. He expelled his wife and sons from the island, and was ultimately killed by Cecrops, in whose kingdom the Corybantes sought refuge. His name is also mentioned by Hesychius of Alexandria in the form Sochus (Σωχός).
Socus, a defender of Troy, son of Hippasus and brother of Charops. The brothers were killed by Odysseus.
Socus, an epithet of Hermes of obscure etymology. According to a scholiast on the Homeric line where the epithet appears, there was an adjective σῶκος which meant "strong". The ancient authors linked the epithet to the Greek stem σω- < σαο- "whole, safe". Despite the attempts of modern scholars to elaborate on this etymological suggestion, no satisfactory explanation has been provided as of 1977.

See also 
  for asteroid 3708 Socus

Notes

References 

Homer, The Iliad with an English Translation by A.T. Murray, Ph.D. in two volumes. Cambridge, MA., Harvard University Press; London, William Heinemann, Ltd. 1924. . Online version at the Perseus Digital Library.
Homer, Homeri Opera in five volumes. Oxford, Oxford University Press. 1920. . Greek text available at the Perseus Digital Library.
Nonnus of Panopolis, Dionysiaca translated by William Henry Denham Rouse (1863-1950), from the Loeb Classical Library, Cambridge, MA, Harvard University Press, 1940.  Online version at the Topos Text Project.
Nonnus of Panopolis, Dionysiaca. 3 Vols. W.H.D. Rouse. Cambridge, MA., Harvard University Press; London, William Heinemann, Ltd. 1940-1942. Greek text available at the Perseus Digital Library.
Quintus Smyrnaeus, The Fall of Troy translated by Way. A. S. Loeb Classical Library Volume 19. London: William Heinemann, 1913. Online version at theoi.com
Quintus Smyrnaeus, The Fall of Troy. Arthur S. Way. London: William Heinemann; New York: G.P. Putnam's Sons. 1913. Greek text available at the Perseus Digital Library.
Realencyclopädie der Classischen Altertumswissenschaft Band IIIA, Halbband 5, Silacenis-Sparsus (1927), s. 803 u. Sokos
 Wilhelm Heinrich Roscher (ed.): Ausführliches Lexikon der griechischen und römischen Mythologie, Band IV (Q - S), Hildesheim, 1965, ss. 1136 - 1137 u. Sokos

Trojans
People of the Trojan War
Epithets of Hermes